is the third album by Japanese hard rock band Rider Chips, released November 11, 2009. It is the first of their albums released on their independent label, instead of through avex mode. The catalogue code for this album is RC-0002 and DAKRCC-2. The first presses of the album include a special version of the cover art.

Track listing

Personnel
Yoshio Nomura – guitar
Koichi Terasawa – bass
Joe – drums
Ricky – vocals
Cher Watanabe – composition, keyboards

References

External links
Rider Chips official website 

2009 albums
Rider Chips albums